German submarine U-753 was a Type VIIC U-boat built for Nazi Germany's Kriegsmarine for service during World War II. Commissioned on 18 June 1941, she served with 3rd U-boat Flotilla until 30 November as a training boat, and as a front boat until 13 May 1943 under the command of Fregattenkapitän Alfred Manhardt von Mannstein.

Design
German Type VIIC submarines were preceded by the shorter Type VIIB submarines. U-753 had a displacement of  when at the surface and  while submerged. She had two shafts and two  propellers.

U-753 was fitted with five  torpedo tubes (four fitted at the bow and one at the stern), fourteen torpedoes, one  SK C/35 naval gun, 220 rounds, and a  C/30 anti-aircraft gun. The boat had a complement of between forty-four and sixty.

Service history
On her sixty-five-day fourth Patrol, U-753 sank two vessels and damaging a further two in the West Indies. Her first victim was twenty-eight days into her voyage, an American merchant vessel, the George Calvert on 20 May 1942. George Calvert was destroyed by three torpedoes off the coast of Cuba, killing three of her fifty-one man crew.

Two days later, E.P. Theriault, a British sailing ship, was attacked by U-753. She did not sink, however, and was taken back to Cuba and repaired. On the morning of 25 May, the Norwegian tanker Haakon Hauan was hit by one of U-753s torpedoes. This vessel also survived and was repaired.

The Norwegian tanker Hamlet, however, did not escape when she encountered the U-boat two days later. Three torpedoes were fired between eleven o'clock and noon. All thirty-six crewmembers survived the sinking and were rescued by nearby fishing boats.

U-753s sixth patrol had her patrolling the North Atlantic, on the European side. Twenty-five days into her forty-two-day voyage on 22 February, U-753 found the ON-166 convoy in the mid-Atlantic, her target: the Norwegian Whale ship N.T. Nielsen-Alonso. U-753 fired two coups de grâce but only hit the ship with one of the torpedoes, failing to sink it. The submarine was forced to leave after a Corvette took notice.

Encounter with Irish Willow

At 2 pm U-753 surfaced and signaled "send master and ship's papers". As Captain Shanks was born in Belfast, and could be regarded as British, this was considered unwise. Chief Officer Henry Cullen, with four crew as oarsmen went instead. In the conning tower, he explained that his 39-year-old Captain was too elderly for the small boat. He reminded them that the next day would be Saint Patrick's Day. Tumblers of Schnapps were produced, along with a bottle of Cognac, for the crew.

Fate
U-753 set off on her seventh and final patrol on 5 May 1943. After a twenty-minute exchange of fire with the aircraft, U-753 dove when the corvette  joined the engagement. The aircraft dropped two depth charges immediately after. An aircraft from the escort carrier  marked the location of the submarine with smoke flares.  caught up to the Drumheller and the two dropped depth charges, finally sinking U-753; all 47 crewmen were lost at sea.

Wolfpacks
U-753 took part in ten wolfpacks, namely:
 Schlei (19 – 24 January 1942) 
 Westwall (2 – 12 March 1942) 
 Luchs (27 September – 6 October 1942) 
 Panther (6 – 16 October 1942) 
 Puma (16 – 22 October 1942) 
 Natter (2 – 8 November 1942) 
 Kreuzotter (8 – 24 November 1942) 
 Hartherz (3 – 7 February 1943) 
 Ritter (11 – 26 February 1943) 
 Drossel (11 – 13 May 1943)

Summary of raiding history

References

Bibliography

External links

World War II submarines of Germany
German Type VIIC submarines
U-boats commissioned in 1941
1941 ships
Maritime incidents in March 1942
U-boats sunk in 1943
U-boats sunk by depth charges
U-boats sunk by British warships
World War II shipwrecks in the Atlantic Ocean
Ships built in Wilhelmshaven
Ships lost with all hands
Maritime incidents in May 1943